The Stage Door is an American drama series that aired live on CBS Tuesday night from 9:00 pm to 9:30 eastern time from February 7, 1950 to March 28, 1950. Based on the play The Stage Door by Edna Ferber and George S. Kaufman, earlier made into a film in 1937.

Synopsis
The series centered on Celia and Hank, two aspiring broadway performers who were also in love with each other.

Cast
 Louise Allbritton as Celia Knox
 Scott McKay as Hank Merlin
 Tom Pedi as Rocca.

Production
Carol Irwin was the producer, with Ralph Nelson as director. Frank Gabrielson and Willard Keefe were writers. The program originated from WCBS-TV and was sustaining.

References

CBS original programming
American live television series
1950 American television series debuts
1950 American television series endings
1950s American drama television series